Events from the year 1740 in Denmark.

Incumbents
 Monarch – Christian VI
 Prime minister – Johan Ludvig Holstein-Ledreborg

Events

Births
 12 October  Thomas Bugge, astronomer and surveyor (died 1815)
 21 November – Charlotte Baden, writer (died 1824)

Undated
 Carl Adolph Castenschiold, landowner and chamberlain, born in the Danish West Indies (died 1820)
 Hedevig Johanne Bagger, businesswoman (died 1822)
 Jürgen Jurgensen's clockmakign company is founded.

Deaths
 19 January – Hans Seidelin, civil servant and landowner (born 1665)
 27 February – Poul Vendelbo Løvenørn, Secretary of War and Minister of the Navy (born 1686)
 19 July – Christian Christophersen Sehested, nobleman (born 1666)

Undated 

 Poul Christian Schindler, composer (born c. 1848)

References

 
1740s in Denmark
Denmark
Years of the 18th century in Denmark